Zogović is a Montenegrin surname often found in Montenegro and derived from the given name Zog, which is of Albanian origin. According to Šimunović, this surname is also found in Dalmatia and is derived from the Albanian word zog 'bird'.

See also 
 Bojan Zogović, a Montenegrin football goalkeeper
 Radovan Zogović, (August 19, 1907 – January 5, 1986), a Montenegrin poet

References

Sources 
 
 

Serbian surnames
Patronymic surnames
Surnames from given names